Joseph Jacobus Maria "Youp" van 't Hek (born 28 February 1954) is a Dutch comedian, author, columnist, singer-songwriter, playwright, and critic.

Biography 
Van 't Hek was born and raised in the Gooi, an upper-class region to the southeast of Amsterdam. In 1973 he changed his name from Joep to Youp. He was one of the founding members of Cabaret NAR (Cabaret Jester). In the early 1980s, Cabaret NAR's success declined and  moved on as a solo artist.
His big break came in 1983 on KRO's De alles is anders-show. His energetic performance made him a household name overnight.

In his 1989 "Oudejaarsconference" (end-of-year show), he ridiculed Buckler, a low-alcohol beer brewed by Heineken. As a result sales plummeted and the brand was eventually withdrawn from the market.  has often cited this as the best joke in his career and has subsequently referred to it in all his retrospective shows.

Van 't Hek is the brother of field hockey international Tom van 't Hek.

Theater performances

With Cabaret NAR 
 Your Youp for you (1973)
 Meer geluk dan wijsheid (More luck than wisdom) (1973)
 Gele ellebogen (Yellow elbows) (1974)
 Blaffende honden (Barking dogs) (1975)
 Alles in Wonderland (Everything in Wonderland) (1976)
 Romantiek met mayonnaise (Romance with mayonnaise) (1977)
 Geen vakantie voor Youp en Jan (No holiday for Youp and Jan) (1978)
 Zat ik maar thuis met een goed boek (If only I were at home with a good book) (1979)
 Zonder twijfel (Without doubt) (1981)

Solo

 Man vermist (Man missing) (1982)
 Gebroken glas (Broken glass) (1983)
 Verlopen en verlaten (literally: Faded and abandoned, or more freely: Down and out) (1984)
 Tunnel zonder vluchtstrook (Tunnel without emergency lane) (1986) This is not a solo-show; he worked with (former) dutch actor Onno Molenkamp (Bukittinggi, 17 januari 1923 – Amsterdam, 11 juli 1990). It was Youp's only 2-men-show.
 Hond op het ijs (Dog on ice) (1987)
 Oudejaarsconference 1989 (New Year's Eve Show) (1989)
 Alles of nooit (All or never) (1991)
 Ergens in de verte (Somewhere in the distance) (1992)
 Spelen met je leven (Playing with your life) (1994)
 Oudejaarsconference 1995 (New Year's Eve Show) (1995)
 Scherven (Shards) (1996)
 De waker, de slaper & de dromer (The guard, the sleeper & the dreamer) (1998)
 Mond vol tanden (New Year's Eve Show) (1999)
 De wereld draait door (meaning both Life goes on and The world is going crazy) (2000)
 Youp speelt Youp (Youp playing Youp, New Year's'Eve Show) (2002)
 Prachtige paprika's (Wonderful sweet peppers) (2003)
 Het zelfmoordcommando (The suicide command) (2005)
 Schreeuwstorm (Shoutstorm) (2006)
 Troost (Comfort, New ear's Eve Show) (2008)
 Omdat de nacht (Because the night) (2009)
 De tweede viool (The second violin, New Year's Eve Show) (2011)
 Wigwam (2012)
 Mooie verhalen (Beautiful stories) (2014)
 Wat is de vraag? (What is the question?, New Year's Eve Show) (2014)
 Licht (Light) (2015–2017)
 Een vloek en een zucht (New Year's Eve Show) (2017) 
 Met de kennis van nu (2018–2020)
 Korrel zout (New Year's Eve Show) (2020)

Music 
Van 't Hek has worked with a changing group of musicians to supply the music to the songs in his shows. The constant factor in his musical backup during almost his entire career has been Ton Scherpenzeel (keyboardist of Kayak), who has composed almost all of his songs. In most of his shows he also worked with multi-instrumentalist Rens van der Zalm. The music to 's songs is mostly played on piano, accordion, violin and acoustic guitar, which reflects 's preference for classical music. One example of this is his rendition of the song Flappie, ostensibly about a Christmas he experienced in 1961. In 2020, the song was covered by Todd Rundgren.

Columns and books 
Van 't Hek has written columns on sports and later on general topics for NRC Handelsblad since 1988. Several collections of these columns have been published by Thomas Rap publishing. Because of this,  never switched publishers. A list of the titles of his books that do not contain the texts of his shows:

Sports columns:
 Niks spel, knikkers ("Not the game, the marbles", it's the opposite of the saying: "It's not about the marbles, it's about the game", meaning that playing is more important than winning) (1989)
 Het hemd van de leeuw ("The undershirt of the lion", reference to a Dutch football song for their national team) (1990)
 Sportgek (Mad about sports) (1990)
 Floppie, Yourie en andere helden (Floppie, Yourie and other heroes) (1992)
 Eerst de man, dan de bal (First the player, then the ball) (1993)
 De selectie ("The selection"/"The squad", a compilation of his best sports columns) (1997)
General columns:
 Amah hoela (wordplay on Amah, a domestic servant, and a Dutch expression "Amehoela" or "Aan m'n hoela", meaning "no way" or "my ass") (1994)
 Ik schreeuwlelijk (I bigmouth, with bigmouth used as a verb) (1995)
 En het bleef nog lang onrustig in mijn hoofd (And my mind remained restless for a long time) (1996)
 Majesteit, (Majesty) (1997)
 Fax (Fax) (1998)
 Zaterdag (Saturday) (1999)
 Het zal me jeuken (literally: "it could itch me", meaning "I couldn't care less") (2000)
 Iedereen is in de war (Everybody is confused/crazy) (2001)
 166x Youp (a compilation of his best columns) (2001)
 Het platte land (literally: "The flat land", referring to the Netherlands, when written as "platteland" it means: "countryside") (2002)
 Liegangst (Fear of lying, wordplay on Fear of flying) (2003)
 Hartjeuk en zieleczeem (Hartitch and souleczema) (2004)
 Het leven is wél leuk (Life IS fun, with the emphasis of denying that "Life sucks") (2005)
 Oelikoeli en andere goden ("Oelikoeli and other gods", Oelikoeli is a god  made up.  is its only believer, because he says that as soon as a god has more than one believer, the believers start fighting each other) (2006)
 Youp is leuk? ("Youp is fun?", a compilation of his best columns) (2007)
 Iedereen is eigenaar van iets (Everybody is the owner of something) (2007)
 Bacteriën moeten ook leven (Bacteria have to live too) (2008)
 Omdat jij mijn beste vriend bent (Because you're my best friend) (2009)
Other books:
 Rijke meiden ("Rich girls", short stories) (1991)
 Liedjes van A tot Z ("Songs from A to Z", an alphabetically ordered collection of lyrics) (2003)
 Komen & gaan, een week scharrelen rond Gare du Nord ("Coming and going, a week of wandering around Gare du Nord", poetry) (2004)
 De wonderlijke broertjes Pim en Pietje ("The amazing brothers Pim and Pietje", children's book) (2004)
 Bob & Youp (photographs by Bob Bronshoff with  improvising a column on what just might be the story behind the picture) (2009)

References

External links

  
 

1954 births
Living people
Dutch atheists
Dutch male comedians
Dutch cabaret performers
Dutch comedy musicians
Dutch comics writers
Dutch critics
Dutch humorists
Dutch male singers
Dutch male writers
Dutch male voice actors
Dutch republicans
Dutch columnists
Dutch bloggers
Dutch male short story writers
Dutch short story writers
Dutch children's writers
Dutch sportswriters
Dutch television personalities
Cabaret singers
Male screenwriters
Dutch male singer-songwriters
Dutch male dramatists and playwrights
People from Naarden
Musicians from Amsterdam
Writers from Amsterdam
Anti-monarchists
Male bloggers
20th-century Dutch dramatists and playwrights
21st-century Dutch dramatists and playwrights